Acrotretoidea is a superfamily of brachiopods containing the following families:

References

Lingulata